Agapito Rodríguez Bermejo (born 16 March 1965) is a Peruvian former footballer who played as a goalkeeper. He made one appearance for the Peru national team in 1993. He was also part of Peru's squad for the 1993 Copa América tournament.

References

External links
 

1965 births
Living people
Peruvian footballers
Association football goalkeepers
Peru international footballers
People from Ica, Peru
Club Alianza Lima footballers
Unión Huaral footballers